Marie Bolou (born 27 November 1992) is a French competitive sailor.

At the 2020 Summer Olympics, held July–August 2021 in Tokyo, she  competed for France in Laser Radial.

References

External links
 

1992 births
Living people
French female sailors (sport)
Olympic sailors of France
Sailors at the 2020 Summer Olympics – Laser Radial
Sportspeople from Quimper
21st-century French women